Cadet is the debut studio album by Cadet. BEC Recordings released the album on April 24, 2001. Cadet worked with producer, Neill King, in the production of this album.

Critical reception

Awarding the album three stars from CCM Magazine, David McCreary states, "this band's self-titled debut achieves in a riveting and surprisingly mature first record." Steve Losey, giving the album four stars for AllMusic, writes, "Cadet offers a disc brimming with sweet melodies, hooky riffs, and simple lyrics that passionately declare truth." Rating the album a nine out of ten at Cross Rhythms, Mike Rimmer says, "More new wave power pop than old school punk, Cadet put some welcome subtlety into the mix and thus set themselves apart from the crowd." Bert Gangl, awarding the album a three out of five for The Phantom Tollbooth, opines, "Cadet album serves, at best, as a mixed blessing for either set of fans." Reviewing the album for Christianity Today, Andy Argyrakis describes, "Cadet's ability to freely express themselves in an easy to identify with manner is exactly where their niche lies. Granted, nothing they've written or played on the disc is breathtaking, monumental, or the next major wave of phenomenal success, but it's just good old fun—exactly what pop music is supposed to be."

Track listing

References

2001 debut albums
Cadet (band) albums
BEC Recordings albums